Cupids is a town of 699 people (per the 2021 Census) on Conception Bay, Newfoundland and Labrador, Canada.  It has also been known as Coopers, Copers Cove, Cupers Cove, and Cuperts. It is the oldest continuously settled official British colony in Canada.  Cupids is believed to be the site of the first child born of European parents in the country.  The town was established by Englishman John Guy in 1610.

In November 2009, the community was visited by The Prince of Wales and The Duchess of Cornwall. In August 2010, the community was visited by many people from around the world to celebrate the Cupids 400th anniversary, including Canadian Governor General Michaëlle Jean. On August 17, 2010, Canada Post released a commemorative stamp in honour of the founding of the community.

2010 also saw the opening of the Cupids Legacy Centre. This facility includes a world class museum, archeology lab, Faerie Garden, Family History archive, Legacy Hall (a modern 2000 square foot open space), and a spacious boardroom.

Demographics 

Arts and culture 
Cupids is home to Perchance Theatre.

See also
 List of communities in Newfoundland and Labrador

References

External links
 
History of the Cupids colony and John Guy
Cupids - Encyclopedia of Newfoundland and Labrador, vol.1, p. 572-573.

Towns in Newfoundland and Labrador